Wymore may refer to one of the following:

People
 Patrice Wymore (1926–2014), American actress
 A. Wayne Wymore (1927–2011), American mathematician and engineer

Places
 Blue Springs-Wymore Township, Gage County, Nebraska
 Wymore, Nebraska